The Waihuka River is a river of the Gisborne Region of New Zealand's North Island. State Highway 2 follows the course of the Waihuka for part of its route between Te Karaka and Matawai.

See also
List of rivers of New Zealand

References

Rivers of the Gisborne District
Rivers of New Zealand